Mahan confederacy (1st century BC to 5th century AD) was an ancient Korean kingdom established after the fall of Baekje.

Monarchs of Mahan confederacy 
The list is based on the records of the Cheongju Han clan.

References 
 
 
 
 
 

Mahan confederacy
History of Korea